Kety may refer to:

People
 Seymour S. Kety (1915–2000), American neuroscientist

Places
 Kety, Perm Krai, Russia
 Kéty, Tolna county, Hungary
 Kęty, Lesser Poland Voivodeship, Poland
 Kęty, Warmian-Masurian Voivodeship, Poland